The 1982–83 Cypriot Third Division was the 12th season of the Cypriot third-level football league. ENTHOI Lakatamia FC won their 1st title.

Format
Fourteen teams participated in the 1982–83 Cypriot Third Division. All teams played against each other twice, once at their home and once away. The team with the most points at the end of the season crowned champions. The first two teams were promoted to 1983–84 Cypriot Second Division. The last two teams were relegated to regional leagues.

Point system
Teams received two points for a win, one point for a draw and zero points for a loss.

League standings

Sources

See also
 Cypriot Third Division
 1982–83 Cypriot First Division
 1982–83 Cypriot Cup

Cypriot Third Division seasons
Cyprus
1982–83 in Cypriot football